Rosario, also known as Rosario Oriental, Villa del Rosario, or Rosario del Colla, is a small city located within the Colonia Department, in southern Uruguay. It is home to about 10,000 people.

Geography

The stream Arroyo Colla flows along the north and northeastern limits of the city, while at the southeast edge of the city, it flows into the river Río Rosario.

History 
The city was founded on 24 January 1775 by Benito Herosa. The place soon became notorious for having witnessed a series of battles during the struggle for independence from Spain in 1811.

Rosario's first inhabitant is believed to have been Pascual de Chena, an amerindian of Colla descent. Today, a square and a brook are named after him. Even the alternative name of the city, Rosario del Colla, makes reference to this fact.

Even before the Independence of Uruguay, Rosario had received the status of "Villa" (town). Its status was elevated to "City" category on 17 August 1920 by the Act of Ley Nº 7.257.

Population 
In 2011 Rosario had a population of 10,085.
 
Source: Instituto Nacional de Estadística de Uruguay
* In the census of 2011, the population of the small hamlet Pastoreo (465 inh. in 2004) has been incorporated to the censual area of Rosario.

Places of worship
 Our Lady of the Rosary Parish Church (Roman Catholic)

Government 
The city mayor as of July 2010 is Daniel Dibot.

Notable people 
 Diego Godín, football player.
 Ruperto Long, engineer, politician and writer.
 Fabio Zerpa, parapsychologist and UFO researcher.
 Carlos Garat Otero, Congressman, Senator

References

External links 

La Microrregión del Rosario 
Rosario at fallingrain.com
INE map of Rosario

Populated places established in 1775
Populated places in the Colonia Department